Saint Mary is an unincorporated community in Johnson County, Nebraska, United States.

History
Saint Mary was originally called Smartville, but it was later renamed after the Saint Mary's Parochial School.

References

Unincorporated communities in Johnson County, Nebraska
Unincorporated communities in Nebraska